Allan Gregg is a Canadian pollster, political advisor, television interviewer and pundit.

Early life
Gregg was born in Edmonton, Alberta. He was the eldest child in his family which consisted of four boys and one girl. Gregg graduated from Harry Ainlay High School at the second top of his class with honors. Gregg then went on to study political science at the University of Alberta and Carleton University in Ottawa. He briefly served as a professor while working on his PhD, but abandoned his studies due to the birth of his first child in 1975.

Tory strategist
Gregg has long been involved in Canadian politics, but decided to travel south of the border to work with Republican Party pollster Richard Wirthlin, and learned much from him.  He then returned to Canada in the late 1970s.  He first came to national attention as the national campaign secretary of the Progressive Conservative Party of Canada successful effort in the 1979 federal election.

Soon after that campaign, Gregg founded Decima Research, a joint polling/public relations firm. The company became the Conservative party's polling firm, and Gregg played an important role in the 1984 election when the PC Party was led by Brian Mulroney.  With the Conservative victory, Decima Research and Gregg entered the halls of power, and he was frequently at Prime Minister Mulroney's side. Decima and Gregg worked for the federal Tories, operated in many provincial elections, and expanded worldwide, participating in over forty-five elections on three continents.

Gregg was an unusual-looking figure in Canadian politics, and especially in the Tory party.  He adopted a unique style including gold earrings, bright red shoes, long hair, and a great deal of leather clothing.  He founded a record label, The Song Corp., and was co-manager of the Tragically Hip.  He also served a five-year stint as Chair of the Toronto International Film Festival.

He rose to greater prominence in the 1988 election where he handled communications and polling for the PC Party.  Long an advocate for negative campaigning, he directed the famed "bridge bombing" attack on Liberal leader John Turner that was designed to break the bridge linking anti-free trade voters to Turner.  The offensive was a success, Turner's popularity dropped, and the Tories were re-elected.  He also played an important role in the 1992 Canadian referendum where he crafted the message that the doom of Canada would be the certain result of a "No" vote.

1993 election
Gregg was given even more responsibility in the 1993 federal election campaign.  He was senior pollster as well as top strategist and communications manager.

The 1993 Conservative Federal campaign was an unmitigated disaster for all concerned, including Gregg.  Other campaign leaders complained that his many duties meant he missed too many meetings.  Gregg again pushed for negative tactics, crafting an attack ad one of which Canadians found especially distasteful and offensive. The ad ridiculed a facial deformity of Liberal leader Jean Chrétien which was a result of a childhood polio infection.  This ad backfired and the Conservatives were reduced to two seats in the House of Commons of Canada from their previous 151 seats. This was the result of a number of factors, including the intense unpopularity of former Conservative Prime Minister Brian Mulroney. His party suffered the worst defeat ever in Canadian history for an incumbent federal party.

While the Tory campaign was not going well, this television ad (which aired on only one evening) was a memorable element. Modern Canadian national political campaign coverage has had few noteworthy campaign moments, but much like the 1984 Mulroney Turner debate ("You had an option, sir"), this advertising mistake was memorable. Attacking a physical defect was widely seen by Canadians as a low blow and as an American-style no-holds-barred campaign style that should not be imported. Several years later Gregg wrote about this in the pages of Saturday Night magazine, where his mea culpa rang hollow, as he continued to argue that "the ad tested well in the focus groups."

Pollster
After the campaign, Gregg left public life for a time.  He quit Decima, and sold his share of the company for millions of dollars. He cut his hair, and turned to a more reserved form of dress.

After a year off, he founded a new company, The Strategic Counsel, a market research and consulting firm, but one geared towards business rather than politics.  He returned to the public eye as a columnist in Maclean's magazine and a frequent pundit on the Canadian Broadcasting Corporation news for several years.

Gregg also had a weekly television show, Allan Gregg in Conversation with... on the public broadcaster TVOntario. Its format was a half-hour, in-depth interview format, in which the subject of the interview was usually an author or intellectual discussing a current release. The format differed from traditional interview programs in that it included more comments from the interviewer (Gregg) than is usually the case. After several years of production TVO cancelled the program.

In 2001, he strongly denounced negative campaigning in a lecture at the School of Journalism and Communication at Carleton University, saying that it would destroy politics as we know it and "invite totally unaccountable forces" to "influence society without the countervailing force of representative democracy".

Personal life
Gregg was born in 1952 and has three children; Christian (b. 1975), Allanah (b. 1986), and Connor (b. 1988); his wife Marjorie died in 1995.

Further reading
"Changing horses in mid-stream: Before last fall's trouncing at the polls, Allan Gregg was the Tory party's whiz kid. Today, the 42-year-old is looking for new challenges." Ian Austen, Southam News. Aug 14, 1994. pg. B.2
"Allan Gregg's record label to partner with musicians: Takes an 'artist friendly' approach to payments, benefits" Brenda Bouw. National Post. Mar 3, 2000. pg. C.1.
"Campbell loyalists sore at bid to blame her for sad campaign" Rosemary Speirs. The Vancouver Sun. Oct 30, 1993. pg. A.12

References

External links 
 Gregg's personal site and blog

1949 births
Canadian political consultants
Canadian political commentators
Canadian television talk show hosts
CBC Television people
Living people
Talent managers
Pollsters